Magharet Qasir Hafee is a cave system in the Hajar Mountains, beyond Buraimi, near Al Ain, UAE. It is the only cave system in the UAE.

Access
Only experienced cavers are allowed access, and it is not open for the general public. The caves network is found on the UAE side of Hajar Mountains.

Reference list

Caves of the United Arab Emirates